Göran Enander, born in Gällstad, Älvsborg County on 1 September 1955, is the County Governor (landshövding) of Uppsala County, Sweden, since 1 November 2016.

Enander was Secretary of State at the Ministry of the Environment and Energy 2014-2015 and has previously had several executive positions, e.g. at the Swedish Research Council (Vetenskapsrådet) and the Forestry Council of Sweden (Skogsstyrelsen).

Between 1998 and 2000, Enander was chairman of the Swedish Society for Nature Conservation. He is a member of the Royal Swedish Academy of Agriculture and Forestry.

See also
List of governors of Uppsala County

References

1955 births
Living people
Members of the Royal Swedish Academy of Agriculture and Forestry
Governors of Uppsala County